Owan East is a Local Government Area of Edo State, Nigeria. The headquarters is in the town of Afuze. The Owan East Local Government Area comprises 69 towns/villages made up of eight clans (Emai, Igue, Ihievbe, Ikao, Ivbi-Mion, Ive-Ada-Obi, Otuo and Uokha).

Owan-East is bordered in the north by Akoko-Edo LGA, in the east by Etsako-West LGA, at the west is Ekiti State, and at the southwest by Owan-West LGA, while in the South are Esan Central LGA and Uhunmwonde LGA.
 
It has an area of 1,240 km and a population of 154,385 persons (81,847 males and 72,538 females) at the 2006 census.

Postal codes
The postal code of the area is 313. (Emai: 313101, Ihievbe: 313102, Ive-Ada-Obi: 313103, Uokha: 313104, Ivbi-Mion: 313105, Igue: 313106, Otuo: 313107, and Ikao: 313108)

References

Local Government Areas in Edo State